Quotaism is the concept of organising society by a quota system, whether by racial, gender, language or another demographic attribute. The basic premise is to have demographics represented at all levels and aspects of the civilization according to national statistics.

A quota system is often part of any affirmative action policies, but in those cases it is mainly used as a "target", within a single entity. Quotaism applies to the whole country and is enforced by legislation on all public and private entities.

Implementation

Bangladesh 
 The Bangladesh Civil Service reserves 30% of its positions to the children and grandchildren of Bangladesh Liberation War veterans, 10% to women, 10% to residents of underdeveloped districts, 5% to the indigenous peoples in Bangladesh, and 1% to disabled people. There have been demonstrations by university students calling for a drastic reduction in these quotas, or their complete abolition.

Brazil 
 Higher Education – In 2012 the Brazilian government introduced legislation for federal universities, where spots are reserved according to the racial make-up of each Brazilian state.

India 
  Reservation - a form of quota-based affirmative action directed by constitutional and statutory laws, half of all the vacancies in government is reserved based on caste, tribe or gender ie. mainly marginalised indigenous SC/ST communities.
  Higher Education - The University Grants Commission (UGC) provides financial assistance to universities/colleges which adopts a reservation policy for admissions and recruitment.
  Sports Quota - Sport ability can be a criterion for being hired for none-sports positions.

South Africa 
Local trade unions commonly use the term "Absolute representation" in this regard.
 BEE (Black Economic Empowerment) – Companies are scored based on the quota of black ownership, senior managers, training, as well as suppliers. These scores then translate into their ability to compete for government tenders.
 Affirmative Action – The SAPS (South African Police Service) operates a quota system policy for hiring and promotion. Positions will be left unfilled if the appropriate demographic candidate cannot be recruited, even if another qualified person is available.
 University Enrollment – First year students are registered on a racial quota basis. In some cases there are different admission requirements for different demographics. For example: to study medicine at the University of Cape Town (UCT), white and Indian students require at least a 78% average on their National Senior Certificate, whereas black students only requires 59%. This is largely as a result of the quota system requiring privileged access for certain ethnic groups - In 2016 the University of KwaZulu-Natal quota for medical students is 69% black African, 19% Indian, 9% coloured, 2% white and 1% other.
 Sport - Sports Minister Fikile Mbalula has imposed quota systems in athletics, cricket, football, netball and rugby.

Criticism 

Quota distribution does not necessarily fit the real composition of the population;
 one demographic may have a higher degree of higher education than another,
 a region/town may have a higher percentage of a certain demographic than the national average for that group.

It is complicated  to keep to a quota system in equilibrium since the demographics are continually changing. Most quota systems are based on national census data, which is tends to be collected once every 5–10 years.

Leaving positions unfilled in state departments can have a negative effect on service delivery. This is a very serious concern when applied in police forces of countries with high crime figures. This can also lead to slow economic growth and social mobility pigeonholing.

Quota systems can have a discriminative effect on minorities;
 Where fewer staff members are required, minorities may not be represented at all. For example; the South-African Indian population only make out 3% of the total population. If only 10 senior managers are required, Indian representation would be calculated as 0.3 of a staff member. This may be round down to the zero.

See also 
 Gender quota (disambiguation) 
 Jewish quota
 Racial quota
 Tokenism

References 

Politics and race
Ethnicity in politics
Affirmative action
Quotas